Operation Magic Sword was a 1965 U.S. military operation designed to test the effectiveness of the sea-borne release of insect vectors for biological agents.

Operation
Operation Magic Sword was U.S. military operation undertaken in 1965. It was designed to ascertain the effectiveness of releasing mosquito vectors for biological agents at sea. It took place off the southeastern coast of the United States and employed yellow fever mosquitoes with the hope of assessing their biting habits following an ocean-borne release.

Results
Magic Sword showed that when coupled with ocean winds that the mosquitoes could travel up to three and one-half miles to shore. The operation also showed that if needed the mosquitoes could be kept alive for cross-ocean journeys.

See also
Entomological warfare
Human experimentation in the United States
Operation Big Itch
Operation Big Buzz

References

Further reading
Hay, Alastair. "A Magic Sword or a Big Itch: An Historical Look at the United States Biological Weapons Programme", Medicine, Conflict and Survival, Volume 15, Issue 3 July 1999, pages 215 - 234, (ISSN 1362-3699).
Horton, Richard C. ''Health Wars: On the Global Front Lines of Modern Medicine, (Google books link), New York Review of Books, 2003, p. 89,.

Magic Sword
Magic Sword
1965 in the United States